A Cry in the Wilderness is a 1974 American TV film directed by Gordon Hessler.

Plot
The father of a wilderness family gets bitten by a skunk, and fearing rabies, chains himself to a barn to protect his family should he go mad. He orders his son not to come near him no matter how persuasive or rational his appearance or argument. However, the creek dries up, indicating an upstream blockage and an imminent flood. Several trips upstream by the son have failed to locate the blockage, and now Dad wants to be released. The boy needs to decide if his father is telling the true or his fear of the flood is due to hydrophobia one of the symptoms of rabies.

Cast
George Kennedy as Sam Hadley
Joanna Pettet as Delda Hadley
Lee Montgomery as Gus Hadley (as Lee H. Montgomery)

References

External links
A Cry in the Wilderness at Letterbox DVD

1974 television films
1974 films
Films directed by Gordon Hessler
American thriller television films
1970s English-language films
1970s American films